Hesperides Hill (Halm Hesperides \'h&lm he-spe-'ri-des\) is a ridge linked by a saddle of elevation 52 m with the northern slopes of Atlantic Club Ridge on Hurd Peninsula, eastern Livingston Island in the South Shetland Islands, Antarctica. The hill surmounts the South Bay coast north of Johnsons Dock to the southwest, and Bulgarian Beach to the northeast and is bounded to the southwest by Sea Lion Glacier.  The ridge extends 420 m in south-southeast to north-northwest direction and is 250 m wide and narrowing towards north-northwest. Hesperides Hill has two heights, 94 and 63 m, the latter surmounting Hespérides Point.  The hill is snow-free in summer months and is named from the adjacent Hespérides Point.

Location
Co-ordinates, elevation and distances given according to a 1995-96 Bulgarian topographic survey).

Maps
 South Shetland Islands. Scale 1:200000 topographic map. DOS 610 Sheet W 62 60. Tolworth, UK, 1968.
 Isla Livingston: Península Hurd. Mapa topográfico de escala 1:25000. Madrid: Servicio Geográfico del Ejército, 1991.
 Islas Livingston y Decepción.  Mapa topográfico a escala 1:100000.  Madrid: Servicio Geográfico del Ejército, 1991.
 S. Soccol, D. Gildea and J. Bath. Livingston Island, Antarctica. Scale 1:100000 satellite map. The Omega Foundation, USA, 2004.
 L.L. Ivanov et al., Antarctica: Livingston Island and Greenwich Island, South Shetland Islands (from English Strait to Morton Strait, with illustrations and ice-cover distribution), 1:100000 scale topographic map, Antarctic Place-names Commission of Bulgaria, Sofia, 2005
 L.L. Ivanov. Antarctica: Livingston Island and Greenwich, Robert, Snow and Smith Islands. Scale 1:120000 topographic map. Troyan: Manfred Wörner Foundation, 2010.  (First edition 2009. )
 Antarctic Digital Database (ADD). Scale 1:250000 topographic map of Antarctica. Scientific Committee on Antarctic Research (SCAR), 1993–2016.
 Antarctica, South Shetland Islands, Livingston Island: Bulgarian Antarctic Base. Sheets 1 and 2. Scale 1:2000 topographic map. Geodesy, Cartography and Cadastre Agency, 2016. (in Bulgarian)
 L.L. Ivanov. Antarctica: Livingston Island and Smith Island. Scale 1:100000 topographic map. Manfred Wörner Foundation, 2017.

References
 Hesperides Hill. SCAR Composite Antarctic Gazetteer
 Bulgarian Antarctic Gazetteer. Antarctic Place-names Commission. (details in Bulgarian, basic data in English)

External links
 Hesperides Hill. Copernix satellite image

Ridges of Livingston Island